The 2020 Sydney Sevens was the fourth tournament in the 2019–20 World Rugby Sevens Series and the eighteenth edition of the Australian Sevens. It was held over the weekend of 1–2 February 2019 at Western Sydney Stadium.  won the tournament to claim their sixth Australian title, narrowly defeating  in the final by 12–10.

This was second tournament in 2019–20 to have only one team from each pool qualify to the cup knockout phase.

Format
The sixteen teams were drawn into four pools of four teams, with each team playing the others in their pool once. The knockout round qualifications were determined by the final pool standings, with the four teams that topped their pool advancing to the semifinals to compete for berths in the cup final or third place match.

The remaining teams had only one further classification match each, based on their position, table points and differential in the pool standings. The four teams that finished second in their pool were paired into direct playoffs for either 5th place or 7th place. The teams that finished third were paired into the playoffs for 9th or 11th. Teams that were last in their pool were paired into playoffs for 13th place or 15th place.

Pool stage
All times in AEDT (UTC+11:00)

Pool A

Pool B

Pool C

Pool D

Placement matches

Fifteenth place

Thirteenth place

Eleventh place

Ninth place

Seventh place

Fifth place

Cup

Tournament placings

See also
 2020 Sydney Women's Sevens
 World Rugby Sevens Series
 2019–20 World Rugby Sevens Series

References

External links
 Tournament site
 World Rugby info

2020
2019–20 World Rugby Sevens Series
2020 in Australian rugby union
February 2020 sports events in Australia